The Essential Van Morrison is a two-disc compilation album by Northern Irish singer-songwriter Van Morrison,  released on August 28, 2015. It is part of Sony BMG's Essential series of compilation albums and includes tracks from Morrison's solo output, as well as tracks from his days with Them. The tracks consist of some of Morrison's biggest hits and popular album tracks from 1964 as leader of the Northern Irish band Them through his 2009 release Astral Weeks Live at the Hollywood Bowl. The liner notes were contributed by David Fricke.

Reception 

The Green Man Review says that the Northern Irish singer and songwriter has spent the past 50 years fusing American jazz, pop, blues, soul and rhythm & blues with Anglo-Irish folk music to create something that's been dubbed Celtic Soul. The Essential is a two-disc, 37-track collection from Sony Legacy celebrates that half-century of song, as part of a huge new reissue project.

Vintage Rock says that with the Essential Van Morrison is a double-disc,
37-track career-spanning anthology that kicks things off in grand style as a thorough introduction to Van Morrison. It all starts with those early Them nuggets like "Gloria" and "Here Comes The Night" before moving onto to Morrsion's first solo hit "Brown Eyed Girl." Of course, "Astral Weeks," the title track of his second solo album changed the game entirely, leading to a career of musical exploration that transcends those early R&B and pop flavorings to more organic strains of country music, jazz, Celtic folk and rock.

Roz Milner from Bearded Gentlemen Music says:

Track listing

Disc one

Disc two

Personnel
Van Morrison – vocals, guitar, rhythm guitar, harmonica, tambourine, backing vocals, production,
 Al Gorgoni and Hugh McCracken – guitars
Jay Berliner –  classical and steel-string acoustic guitars
Barry Kornfeld –  acoustic guitar on "The Way Young Lovers Do"
 Eric Gale – bass
Richard Davis – double bass
 Gary Chester – drums
 Paul Griffin – piano
 Garry Sherman – conductor, organ, actual arranger, musical supervisor
 The Sweet Inspirations – back-up vocals for "Brown Eyed Girl"
Warren Smith Jr. –  percussion, vibraphone
Connie Kay – drums

Them
Peter Bardens – keyboards, organ (track 1)
Billy Harrison – guitar (track 1)
Alan Henderson – bass (track 1)
John McAuley – drums, piano, harmonica (track 1)

Charts

Release history

Certifications

Notes

References 

Van Morrison compilation albums
2015 compilation albums
Sony Music compilation albums
Legacy Recordings compilation albums
Albums produced by Dick Rowe
Albums produced by Lewis Merenstein
Albums produced by Van Morrison
Albums produced by Ted Templeman